Mahapatra or Mohapatra or Mahapatro, is a Brahmins family name in India mostly found in parts of (alphabetical order) Bengal, Madhya Pradesh, Odisha, Uttar Pradesh and sparsed in bordering states. Also used by Maulika Kayastha and Kshatriya communities Khandayats, Gopalas and Karanas of Odisha.

Notable people
Shantanu Mohapatra (1936-2020), Indian musician, singer and composer
Jayanta Mahapatra (born 1928), Indian Writer, Poet
Siddhanta Mahapatra (born 1966), Indian Actor
Sitakant Mahapatra (born 1937), Indian Poet
Jadumani Mahapatra (1781–1868), Court Poet, humourist and satirist
Kelucharan Mohapatra (1926–2004), Indian dancer
Manmohan Mahapatra (1951–2020),  Oriya filmmaker, director, producer, and writer
Pyarimohan Mohapatra (1940–2017), Indian bureaucrat, politician
Souvik Mahapatra, Indian engineer
Sona Mohapatra (born 1976), Indian singer
Nirad N. Mohapatra (1947–2015), film director
Nityananda Mohapatra (1912–2012), Indian writer
Ramesh Prasad Mohapatra (1939–1989), Indian historian and archaeologist
Rabindra Mohapatra (born 1944), Indian theoretical physicist
Raghunath Mohapatra (1943–2021), Member of Parliament
Bibhu Mohapatra (born 1972), Indian fashion designer
Bibhuprasad Mohapatra (born 1991), Indian writer
Bijoy Mohapatra (born 1950), Indian politician

References

Indian surnames